Ana Lilia Guillén Quiroz (born 5 February 1955) is a Mexican politician affiliated with the Party of the Democratic Revolution. As of 2014 she served as deputy of the LIX Legislature of the Mexican Congress representing Michoacán.

References

1955 births
Living people
Politicians from Michoacán
Women members of the Chamber of Deputies (Mexico)
Party of the Democratic Revolution politicians
Deputies of the LIX Legislature of Mexico
Members of the Chamber of Deputies (Mexico) for Michoacán